Sørstokken is a peninsula on the island of Stord in Stord Municipality in Vestland county, Norway. Other than a small residential area on the isthmus, Stord Airport, Sørstokken is the only major thing located on the peninsula.

References

Peninsulas of Vestland
Stord